Explorer's Rock was a large rock in the Colorado River that was a hazard to navigation at the mouth of the Black Canyon of the Colorado between Arizona and Nevada during the 19th century.  It got its name from incident where the iron hulled steamboat Explorer struck it doing some damage, during the expedition of Lieutenant Joseph C. Ives, Corps of Topographical Engineers to explore the Colorado River of the West in 1857 and 1858.

Explorer's Rock, was 4 miles above El Dorado Canyon.  This location is just east of Squaw Peaks.

History 
Explorer's Rock located at the entrance to the Black Canyon of the Colorado was one of the significant hazards to navigation to steamboats, barges, and other shipping when ascending or descending the Colorado River between El Dorado Canyon and Callville or Rioville, in the 19th Century.

It lay above a short rapid below the mouth of the canyon just below the surface in a reach of still water. Ives describes the circumstances of the collision:

Ives and his boat captain David C. Robinson examined the hidden rock:

A Report of the Chief of Engineers U.S. Army in 1885 suggested the upper portion of the rock be blasted away to clear the hazard to navigation but this was never done.

The Site Today 
Explorer's Rock lies in place but under the deeper waters of Lake Mohave.

References 

Colorado River
History of Arizona
History of Nevada